Lawrence Rosario Abavana (1920 – 29 May 2004) was a Ghanaian politician and teacher by profession. He served in various ministerial portfolios in the first republic and also served as a member of the council of state in the third republic. He was a member of the  Convention People's Party (CPP).

Early life and education
Lawrence was born in 1920 at Navrongo.
He had his early education at the Roman Catholic School in Navrongo. He continued at Achimota College where he was trained as a teacher.

Politics

Member of parliament 
He was elected as a member of the legislative assembly in 1951 representing Kassena-Nankana South under the ticket of the Convention People's Party (CPP) that same year, he was appointed ministerial secretary to the minister of communication and works. In 1954, he defeated J. E. Seyire of the Northern People's Party by 5,795 to 3,344 to retain his seat as a member of the legislative assembly.

Ministerial secretary 
In 1951 along with winning the Kassena-Nankana South seat under the ticket of the CPP he was appointed as ministerial secretary to the minister of communication and works. He became ministerial secretary to the minister of agriculture that same year of 1951.

Minister of State 
In 1956, he was appointed minister without portfolio. A year later he was given a portfolio – agriculture. As Minister for Agriculture, he led the Ghana delegation to a cocoa conference in September 1957. On 4 November 1957, he was appointed regional commissioner for Northern Ghana (this included the Northern Region the Upper East Region and the Upper West Region), and in July 1960, he was appointed Minister for Health.

In May 1961, he was appointed Minister for Trade; as the Minister for Trade he led the Ghana delegation to Dahomey in August 1961. He was appointed Minister of Agriculture for the second time in October that same year, and in September 1962, he was appointed Minister for Information and Broadcasting. As information minister, he led the Ghana delegation to the Conference of Information Ministers from Commonwealth African Countries, London in July 1963. He served as Minister for Health for a second occasion from October 1963 to January 1964. As Minister for Health, he led the Ghana delegation to the Health, Sanitation, and Nutrition Conference held in Alexandria, United Arab Republic (UAR) in January 1964. He led another delegation in March 1964 to the World Health Assembly, Geneva.

In May 1964, he was appointed Minister for Interior, and in February 1965, Minister for Mines and Mineral Resources. On 11 June 1965, he was reappointed as Minister for Interior. He served in that capacity until the Nkrumah government was overthrown in 1966.

Member of council of State 
He was appointed a member of Council of state in the third republic by Hilla Limann which lasted from 1979 to 1981, until Hilla Limann was deposed in a coup by Jerry John Rawlings on 31 December 1981.

Personal life
His hobbies included Tennis. He was a Roman Catholic and he served as the president of the Retired Catholic Workers Association from 1992 until his death.

Death
He died at the age of 84 on 29 May 2004. He was given a state burial in his hometown in Navrongo, Upper East Region on 3 July 2004.

Memorials and legacy 
Streets, roads, crescents and junctions have been named in honour of him, most popular amongst them are ones within the Accra Metropolitan specifically in Kotobabi and Maamobi. There are schools within Accra and Northern which have structures named in honour of him, most notable amongst them is the Abavana Cluster of Schools, a basic school in Kotobabi within the Accra Metropolitan area.

See also
 Nkrumah government
 Minister for Food and Agriculture (Ghana)
 Minister for Health (Ghana)
 Minister for Trade and Industry (Ghana)
 Minister for the Interior (Ghana)
 List of MLAs elected in the 1954 Gold Coast legislative election
 List of MLAs elected in the 1956 Gold Coast legislative election
 List of MPs elected in the 1965 Ghanaian parliamentary election

References

1920 births
2004 deaths
Alumni of Achimota School
Convention People's Party (Ghana) politicians
Ghanaian MPs 1951–1954
Ghanaian MPs 1954–1956
Ghanaian MPs 1956–1965
Ghanaian MPs 1965–1966
Interior ministers of Ghana
Information ministers of Ghana
Agriculture ministers of Ghana
Trade ministers of Ghana
Ghanaian educators
Ghanaian Roman Catholics
Health ministers of Ghana
People from Upper East Region